Frederick Kaye may refer to:

 Frederick A. Kaye (1796–1866), mayor of Louisville, Kentucky
 F. B. Kaye (Frederick Benjamin Kaye, 1892–1930), scholar